Loomis is a census-designated place (CDP) in Okanogan County, Washington, United States. The population was 159 at the 2010 Census.

History
A post office called Loomis has been in operation since 1889. The community was named after J. A. Loomis, a local storekeeper.

On November 3, 1901, J.M. Haggerty was tarred and feathered in Loomis. He made comments to The Spokesman-Review about the lack of success of the Palmer Mountain Tunnel Company. The comments were resented and a mob was waiting for him when he stepped off the stage.  During an impromptu mass meeting, "Suddenly a dozen men grabbed Haggerty, and before half the crowd knew what was happening a bucket of tar and pillows were produced." After half an hour of being paraded through the street covered in tar and feathers, he was released.

Climate

North Star Ranch

According to the Köppen climate classification system, North Star Ranch has a Cold semi-arid climate (BSk) with warm summers and cold winters. Dew points (how humid it feels) are typically very dry even during the summer months. Because of this, summer heat index values are often a few degrees lower than the ambient air temperature. Severe thunderstorms are very rare. December is the average wettest month of the year which correlates with the peak frequency of storms crossing the area via the Pacific Ocean. Episodes of extreme cold and wind can occur with wind chill values < . North Star Ranch averages ≈  of snow per cool season.

Loomis

According to the Köppen climate classification system, Loomis has a Cold semi-arid climate (BSk) with warm summers and cold winters. Dew points (how humid it feels) are typically very dry even during the summer months. Because of this, summer heat index values are often a few degrees lower than the ambient air temperature. Severe thunderstorms are very rare. December is the average wettest month of the year which correlates with the peak frequency of storms crossing the area via the Pacific Ocean. Episodes of extreme cold and wind can occur with wind chill values < .

See also
 Nighthawk-Chopaka Border Crossing

References

Radio

Census-designated places in Washington (state)
Census-designated places in Okanogan County, Washington
Populated places in the Okanagan Country
Tarring and feathering in the United States